Stéphanie Balme is the Dean of College of Sciences at Sciences Po College (undergraduate studies). She is a permanent research fellow at CERI and professor at PSIA/Sciences Po and the Euro-Asia Campus/Sciences Po.

Education
Balme obtained her Habilitation in Law (qualification as a Ph.D. Supervisor and full professor under the French system) from Sciences Po School of Law in 2016. Previous to her 2001 post-doc position at Hong Kong Baptist University, Stéphanie Balme obtained her Ph.D. from Sciences Po Paris in December 2000. She received a master's degree (M. Phil or Diplôme d’Etudes Approfondies, DEA) from Sciences Po, a master's degree (M. Phil DEA) from the National Institute of Oriental Languages and Civilizations (Langues’O), the award "Prix de la Chancellerie des Universités de Paris" in 1998 as well as a bachelor's degree from the Institute of Political Studies (Bordeaux) and a bachelor's degree from the University of Bordeaux (Department of Humanities). She was an international student at Fudan University (Shanghai, Department of International Relations) from 1992 to 1993.

Career
Balme is the program director of Sciences Po's research group “Law, Justice and Society in China” since 2006, and the scientific advisor for the “China and East Asia” concentration at PSIA/Sciences Po. She was a Visiting Professor at Columbia University (Law School–Fall 2014) and both a Visiting Professor and Research Associate at Tsinghua University (Faculty of Law, 2006–2012 in Beijing) and at the Chinese University of Hong Kong (2003–2006).
She co-founded with Professor Wang Zhenmin the Sino-French Rule of Law Dialogue.

Balme is among the founding members and now vice-president of the European China Law Studies Association (ECLS) based in Hamburg (Germany)  as well as a board member of the GIS/CNRS Asia Pacific Group (Paris). She is a research associate of the Institute of High Studies on Justice (IHEJ) of the French Ministry of Justice, a senior reviewer at the Hong Kong Research Grants Council (2012 to present) and consultant for international organizations and think tanks such as UNDP, the European Union, World Bank, China Policy or Asialyst. Past experiences also include being the head of the delegation of the Civil Law Initiative (Fondation pour le Droit Continental) in Beijing (2009–2010); co-director of the European Study Group on Contemporary Viêt Nam/Sciences Po (2002–2006) and delegation member of the China Adoption Team for the NGO “Doctors of the World” (Médecins du Monde) in Paris (1996–1998). She has taught in France, Belgium, China, Hong Kong, the United States, Canada (UQAM and UBC) and New Delhi (Ashoka University). Her publications have mainly appeared in French, English and Chinese. Her co-authored book, Le procès civil en version originale. Cultures judiciaires comparées: France, Chine, Etats-Unis, is the recipient of the 2015  (legal book award).

Publications

Books
Chine, les visages de la justice ordinaire – Entre faits et droit, Presses de Sciences Po, 2016, 336p. 
 Comparer les Cultures Judiciaires en France, aux Etats-Unis et en Chine (English Title : Comparing Judicial Cultures: the Cases of France, China and the United States), co-authored with Antoine Garapon, Li Bin and Daniel Schimmel, Ebook, LexisNexis, Paris, New York, 2014.  
 La Tentation de la Chine: Nouvelles idées reçues sur une puissance en mutation, Le Cavalier Bleu, Paris, April 2013, 350p. 
 Building Constitutionalism in China (eds.) with Michael Dowdle, Palgrave-Macmillan CERI, New York, 2009, 322p. 
 La Chine et les Etats-Unis: fascinations et rivalités, (English title: China and the US: Between Fascination and Rivalry), co-authored with Daniel Sabbagh (CERI/Sciences Po), Autrement, Paris, 2008, 172p.
 Vietnam’s New Order: International Perspectives on the State and Law Reform, with Mark Sidel (eds.), Palgrave-Macmillan CERI, 2006, 272p. 
 La Chine – Les Idées Reçues (English title : China), Cavalier Bleu, Paris, 2004, (2nd edition 2008), 140p.
 Entre soi, l’élite du pouvoir dans la Chine contemporaine, (English title : Power Elite in Contemporary China), Fayard, Paris, 2004, 474p. 
 你对法律了解多少 ? (in Chinese) (English title: What do you know about Law?), co-authored with Judge Wang Yaqin, Nanjing Shifan Daxue Chubanshe, Nanjing, 2009, 48p.

Book chapters or reviews (selection)
 “Chine : la règle de droit aux marges d'un empire bureaucratique et absolutiste (1978-2014)”, Revue Francaise d’administration publique, N. 150 September 2014, 2 Paris, pp. 393–413
 “Rule of Law as a Watermark: China’s Legal and Judicial Challenges”, The World Bank Law Review, Washington, December 2012, 22p. 
 "China: Law and Society", in Mireille Delmas-Marty; Pierre-Etienne Will, China and Democracy, 2011, 32p. 
 "Local Courts in Western China: The Quest for Independence and Dignity”, Chapter 8 in Randy Peerenboom (eds.), Judicial Independence in China: A Comparative Developmental Approach, Oxford University Press, Oxford, 2009, p. 154-180. 
 “Ordinary Justice and Popular Constitutionalism in China”, Chapter 11 in Balme, Dowdle (eds.), 2009, 178-200p. 
 “China’s Constitutional Research and Teaching: A State of the Art”, by Prof. Tong Zhiwei,(translated by author) in Balme, Dowdle (eds.), 2009, p. 98-112p. 
 “Introduction to Chinese Political System” (in French) in Antonin Cohen; Lacroix Bernard, Comparative Political Science Textbook, La Découverte, 2009.  28p.
 "Droit et politique en Chine après Mao" (Law and Politics after Mao) (in French), in Mireille Demas-Marty; P.-E Will, La Chine et la Démocratie, Fayard, 2007, Paris, 50p.
 "China’s Soft Power Strategy", CERIscope, September 2013
 “Access to Justice in China: Review of Efforts to Improve Judicial Efficiency and Reduce Judicial Costs”, EU-UNDP-The People's Supreme Court of the PRC, May 2012 (bilingual: Chinese/English), 40p. 
 “‘世俗化’与法治的概念：关于法国“禁止在公共场所穿遮面长袍（burka）”新法案的讨论”, “French Conceptions of “Laicity” and Rule of Law: Debating the New Law Banning Full-face Veil in Public Places in France” (in Chinese), Tsinghua University Law Review, December 2011. 
 "The Judicialization of Politics and the Politicisation of the Judiciary in China (1978-2005)", The Global Jurist Frontiers, vol 5, n° 1, 2005 (Berkeley Electronic Law Review)
 “Communism and Schizophrenia: Individual Citizens and Law in Post-Revolutionary China" (in French), Raisons Politiques, Special edition, Autumn 2001, Paris, 32p. 
 "From ‘guanxi’ to Law? The Role of Formal Rules and Regulations in Modernizing China” (in French), Raisons Politiques, n°3, March 2000, Paris, 26p.

References

French legal scholars
Living people
Year of birth missing (living people)